The Department of Consumer and Employment Protection was a department of the Government of Western Australia. As of 1 January 2009, it became the Department of Commerce.

Preceding authorities

Legislation was not enacted in Western Australia until the 1970s.
The names and dates of preceding authorities:

Ministry of Fair Trading       (1993-01-01 - 2001-07-01)

Ministry of Consumer Affairs   (1988-01-01 - 1993-01-01)
Bureau of Consumer Affairs     (1975-01-01 - 1983-01-01)
Consumer Protection Bureau     (1972-01-01 - 1975-01-01)

External links
 Government of Western Australia website
 Department of Consumer and Employment Protection website

References

Consumer
2009 disestablishments in Australia
Government agencies disestablished in 2009